Tilloo Cay National Reserve is a national park in Hope Town, the Abaco Islands, the Bahamas.

Flora and fauna
The reserve provides an important nesting site for the white-tailed tropicbird.

References

National parks of the Bahamas
Abaco Islands